Eucosma caliacrana is a species of moth of the family Tortricidae. It is found in China, Mongolia, Japan, Russia, Romania and Bulgaria.

References

Moths described in 1931
Eucosmini